Dorrer Glacier is a glacier just south of Mount Heiser, flowing east into Lowery Glacier from the northeast slopes of the Queen Elizabeth Range. It was mapped by the United States Geological Survey from tellurometer surveys and Navy air photos, 1960–62, and was named by the Advisory Committee on Antarctic Names for Egon Dorrer, a United States Antarctic Research Program glaciologist on the Ross Ice Shelf 1962–63 and 1965–66.

References 

Glaciers of the Ross Dependency
Shackleton Coast